Northumberland, was a County constituency of the House of Commons of the Parliament of England from 1290 to 1707, then of the Parliament of Great Britain from 1707 to 1800 and of the Parliament of the United Kingdom from 1801 to 1832. It was represented by two Members of Parliament.

The constituency was split into two two-member divisions, for Parliamentary purposes, by the Reform Act of 1832. The county was then represented by the Northumberland North and Northumberland South constituencies.

Members of Parliament

MPs 1290–1640

MPs 1640–1832

Elections

The county franchise, from 1430, was held by the adult male owners of freehold land valued at 40 shillings or more. Each elector had as many votes as there were seats to be filled. Votes had to be cast by a spoken declaration, in public, at the hustings, which took place in the town of Alnwick. The expense and difficulty of voting at only one location in the county, together with the lack of a secret ballot contributed to the corruption and intimidation of electors, which was widespread in the unreformed British political system.

The expense, to candidates, of contested elections encouraged the leading families of the county to agree on the candidates to be returned unopposed whenever possible. Contested county elections were therefore unusual. The Tory Percys, led by the Duke of Northumberland, shared the county representation with the Whig Grey Family.

See also

History of parliamentary constituencies and boundaries in Northumberland
List of former United Kingdom Parliament constituencies
Unreformed House of Commons

Sources

Robert Beatson, A Chronological Register of Both Houses of Parliament (London: Longman, Hurst, Res & Orme, 1807) 
D Brunton & D H Pennington, Members of the Long Parliament (London: George Allen & Unwin, 1954)
Cobbett's Parliamentary history of England, from the Norman Conquest in 1066 to the year 1803 (London: Thomas Hansard, 1808) 

Parliamentary constituencies in Northumberland (historic)
Constituencies of the Parliament of the United Kingdom established in 1290
Constituencies of the Parliament of the United Kingdom disestablished in 1832